The Nahua are an indigenous people of Mexico and Central America.

Nahua may also refer to:
Nahuatl, the language of the Nahuas
Nahuan languages, a subgroup of the Uto-Aztecan languages, including Nahuatl
Nahua, or Yaminawa language, a language of Peru